The Aiguilles d’Arves is a mountain in the Arves massif in the French Alps. The mountain, comprising three separate peaks (in French Aiguille), is the highest point of the massif, and is located in the department of Savoie.

Geography 

The summits that make up the Aiguilles d'Arves are described in the following table.

For reasons apparent from the picture, Aiguille Septentrionale is also called the Tête de Chat (Cat Head).

Ascents 
The central peak of the Aiguilles d’Arves was first climbed by the brothers Pierre Alexis and Benoît Nicolas Magnin, from nearby Saint-Michel-de-Maurienne, on 2 September 1839. As evidence they built a cairn and left two Sardinian coins under a rock on the summit.

The southern summit was first climbed by the Swiss mountain guides Christian and Ulrich Almer and their American client, W. A. B. Coolidge from New York. During the 1870s and 1880s, Coolidge claimed a number of first ascents and worked extensively in the Dauphiné Alps. Earlier, the same party had climbed L’Auguille Centrale in 1874. On the summit, they found the cairn built by the Magnin brothers, but ascribed it to "a legendary chamois hunter". The day after their ascent of L’Aiguille Meridionale in 1878, Benoît Magnin informed them about his ascent 39 years prior.

References

External links
 Aiguilles d’Arves Refuge

Alpine three-thousanders
Mountains of the Alps
Mountains of Savoie